Carenum nickerli is a species of ground beetle in the subfamily Scaritinae. It was described by Ancey in 1880.

References

nickerli
Beetles described in 1880